Kamasa is a nearly extinct Angan language of Morobe Province, Papua New Guinea. It is spoken in Katsiong village, Tsewi ward, Kome Rural LLG.

References

Languages of Morobe Province
Angan languages
Endangered Papuan languages
Critically endangered languages